"Young" Billy McAllister (12 February 1907 – 30 April 1984) born in Melbourne, was an Australian professional fly/bantam/featherweight boxer of the 1920s and 1930s who won the Australian flyweight title, Australian bantamweight title, and British Empire bantamweight title, his professional fighting weight varied from , i.e. flyweight to , i.e. featherweight.

References

External links

Article - Empire Boxing Title

1907 births
1984 deaths
Australian male boxers
Bantamweight boxers
Featherweight boxers
Flyweight boxers
Boxers from Melbourne
Commonwealth Boxing Council champions